Dominion is an annual professional wrestling event promoted by New Japan Pro-Wrestling (NJPW). The event has been held annually since 2009 as a pay-per-view (PPV). From 2013 to 2014, the event also aired outside Japan as an Internet pay-per-view (iPPV). Since 2015, the event has aired worldwide on NJPW's Internet streaming site, NJPW World. Dominion is the first major event following the Best of the Super Juniors tournament and usually includes a match, where the tournament winner challenges for the IWGP Junior Heavyweight Championship, assuming the champion has not won the tournament. In recent years, Dominion has developed into one of NJPW's showcase events and it is considered the biggest event since the January 4 Dome Show. The first six Dominions took place in June. In 2015, the event was moved to July, but was moved back to June the following year. Originally the event was held at Osaka Prefectural Gymnasium (also known as Bodymaker Colosseum) until 2014; since 2015, the event has been held at Osaka-jō Hall. The 2020 event was scheduled to be held on June 14 but was postponed to July 12 to allow the rescheduled New Japan Cup to take place, this is the first time since 2015 that Dominion took place in July.

Events

Notes

See also

List of New Japan Pro-Wrestling pay-per-view events

References

External links
The official New Japan Pro-Wrestling website
Dominion at ProWrestlingHistory.com